Snorri Þorbrandsson (also Snorri Thorbrandsson) was a 10th-century Icelandic warrior. The main sources of Snorri's life are the semi-historical Icelandic sagas.

Snorri appears as a character in the Icelandic Eyrbyggja saga. He was from the area of Álftafjörður in west Iceland. He was a blood-brother of  Snorri goði  and comrade-in-arms with Þorfinnr Karlsefni. Following mild injury and outlawry resulting from a conflict with Steinthor Thorlaksson (Steinthor of Eyr),  Snorri traveled to Greenland with his brother Thorleif Kimbi and perished in battle against the skrælings, the Indigenous peoples of the Americas), during Karlsefni's trip to Vinland.

References

Other sources
Pencak, William (1995)  The Conflict of Law and Justice in the Icelandic Sagas (Rodopi)

Related Reading
Magnusson, Magnus; Pálsson, Hermann (1965)  The Vinland Sagas (Penguin) 
Smiley, Jane (2001)  The Sagas of the Icelanders (Viking Penguin) 

Norse colonization of North America